Terry Casey may refer to:

 Terry Casey (Royal Navy sailor), Warrant Officer of the Naval Service
 Terry Casey (trade unionist), British trade union leader
 Terry Casey (ice hockey), American ice hockey player